Gabil Abil ogly Mamedov (born 19 April 1994) is a Russian boxer of Azerbaijani origin. He competed in the men's lightweight event at the 2020 Summer Olympics.

References

External links
 

1994 births
Living people
Russian male boxers
Russian sportspeople of Azerbaijani descent
Russian people of Azerbaijani descent
Olympic boxers of Russia
Boxers at the 2020 Summer Olympics
People from Orenburg
Boxers at the 2019 European Games
European Games medalists in boxing
European Games silver medalists for Russia
Sportspeople from Orenburg Oblast